μ Normae, Latinised as Mu Normae, is a blue supergiant star of spectral type O9.7 Iab, located in the constellation of Norma.

It shines as bright as 339,000 suns and is weighs 40 solar masses. It varies in visual magnitude between 4.87 and 4.98, and is suspected of being an Alpha Cygni variable, which are named after Deneb.

It is in the same direction and at the same distance as the faint open cluster NGC 6169, although it is brighter than the combined magnitude of all the other stars in the cluster.  It was considered the prototype of the μ Normae class of open clusters by Collinder.

References

External links
 Jim Kaler's stars - Mu Normae

O-type supergiants
Norma (constellation)
Alpha Cygni variables
Normae, Mu
6155
081122
149038
Durchmusterung objects
Runaway stars